3-Mercaptopropane-1,2-diol, also known as thioglycerol, is a chemical compound and thiol that is used as a matrix in fast atom bombardment mass spectrometry and liquid secondary ion mass spectrometry.

See also 

 Glycerol
 Mercaptoethanol

References

Solvents
Thiols
Vicinal diols
Mass spectrometry